Orlando Apopka Airport  is a privately owned, uncontrolled, public-use airport located four nautical miles (7 km) northwest of the central business district of Apopka, in Orange County, Florida, United States. It was previously known as Orlando Country Airport and McDonald Airport prior to that, the latter due its proximity to the unincorporated community of McDonald, Florida.

Facilities and aircraft 
It has one asphalt paved runway designated 15/33 which measures 3,987 by 60 feet (991 x 18 m). Runway 15 has a displaced threshold of 943 feet, leaving an available landing distance for that runway of 3,044 feet.

The common areas of the airport are maintained by the OAA Owners Association, but the hangars and lots are individually owned.

For the 12-month period ending January 16, 2009, the airport had 21,900 general aviation aircraft operations, an average of 60 per day. At that time there were 43 aircraft based at this airport: 84% single-engine and 16% multi-engine.

References

External links 

 Official Website for Orlando Apopka Airport 
 Hangar & Lot Sales: ApopkaHangars.com
 Green Flight International
 Hangar Sales https://OrlandoApopkaAirport.com
 Hangar & Lot Sales
 

Airports in Florida
Transportation buildings and structures in Orange County, Florida
Apopka, Florida
Privately owned airports